Prince Bernhard of Saxe-Weimar-Eisenach (Bernhard Carl Alexander Hermann Heinrich Wilhelm Oscar Friedrich Franz Peter; 18 April 1878 – 1 October 1900) was a member of the Grand Ducal House of Saxe-Weimar-Eisenach and a Lieutenant in the Prussian Army. He bore the titles "Prince of Saxe-Weimar-Eisenach, Duke of Saxony" with the style "Highness".

Birth and family
Prince Bernhard was born in Weimar the second son of Charles Augustus, Hereditary Grand Duke of Saxe-Weimar-Eisenach and his wife Princess Pauline of Saxe-Weimar-Eisenach. He was the younger brother of the last Grand Duke of Saxe-Weimar-Eisenach, William Ernest. His grandparents on his father's side were the reigning Grand Duke Charles Alexander and his wife Princess Sophie of the Netherlands, through whom he was in the line of succession to the Dutch throne.

Suitor to Dutch Queen Wilhelmina
Closely related to the Dutch Royal Family from a young age Prince Bernhard was seen as the ideal husband to the young Queen Wilhelmina of the Netherlands and was brought up to look upon himself as her future consort, with her mother Queen Emma a proponent of the match. Although an engagement was reported to be close on numerous occasions the young Queen was not a fan of the match describing her cousin Prince Bernhard as "not handsome" and "not sensible".

When Queen Wilhelmina did not return Prince Bernhard's affection he was reported to have become depressed, dying at the age of 22 in Weimar. His sudden death was reported to be the result of tuberculosis although there were rumors he may have committed suicide. Shortly after his death Queen Wilhelmina's engagement was announced to Duke Henry of Mecklenburg-Schwerin.

Ancestry

References

1878 births
1900 deaths
Princes of Saxe-Weimar-Eisenach
Military personnel from Weimar
Nobility from Weimar